Dopet (English: the baptism) is the second studio album by Swedish pop rock band Stiftelsen. It was released in 2013. All tracks on the album were written by Robert Petterson, the group's main vocalist. Dopet debuted at number one on the Swedish Albums Chart.

Track listing

Musicians
Robert Pettersson - vocals, guitar
Micke Eriksson - guitar
Arne Johansson - bass
Martin Källström - drums

Charts

Weekly charts

Year-end charts

References

2013 albums
Stiftelsen (band) albums
Swedish-language albums
Universal Music Group albums